This list of birds of New Mexico are the species documented in the U.S. state of New Mexico and accepted by the New Mexico Bird Records Committee (NMBRC). As of August 2022, 552 species were included in the official list. Of them, 176 are on the review list (see below), five species have been introduced to North America, and three have been extirpated. An additional extirpated species has been added from another source.

This list is presented in the taxonomic sequence of the Check-list of North and Middle American Birds, 7th edition through the 63rd Supplement, published by the American Ornithological Society (AOS). Common and scientific names are also those of the Check-list, except that the common names of families are from the Clements taxonomy because the AOS list does not include them.

Unless otherwise noted, all species listed below are considered to occur regularly in New Mexico as permanent residents, summer or winter visitors, or migrants. These tags are used to annotate some species:

(R) Review list - birds that if seen require more comprehensive documentation than regularly seen species. These birds are considered irregular or rare in New Mexico.
(I) Introduced - a species established in North America as a result of human action
(Ex) Extirpated - a species no longer found in New Mexico but which exists elsewhere

Ducks, geese, and waterfowl

Order: AnseriformesFamily: Anatidae

The family Anatidae includes the ducks and most duck-like waterfowl, such as geese and swans. These birds are adapted to an aquatic existence with webbed feet, bills which are flattened to a greater or lesser extent, and feathers that are excellent at shedding water due to special oils. Thirty-nine species have been recorded in New Mexico.

Black-bellied whistling-duck, Dendrocygna autumnalis (R)
Fulvous whistling-duck, Dendrocygna bicolor (R)
Snow goose, Anser caerulescens
Ross's goose, Anser rossii
Greater white-fronted goose, Anser albifrons
Brant, Branta bernicla (R)
Cackling goose, Branta hutchinsii
Canada goose, Branta canadensis
Trumpeter swan, Cygnus buccinator (R)
Tundra swan, Cygnus columbianus
Wood duck, Aix sponsa
Garganey, Spatula querquedula (R)
Blue-winged teal, Spatula discors
Cinnamon teal, Spatula cyanoptera
Northern shoveler, Spatula clypeata
Gadwall, Mareca strepera
Eurasian wigeon, Mareca penelope (R)
American wigeon, Mareca americana
Mallard, Anas platyrhynchos
Mexican duck, Anas diazi
Northern pintail, Anas acuta
Green-winged teal, Anas crecca
Canvasback, Aythya valisineria
Redhead, Aythya americana
Ring-necked duck, Aythya collaris
Greater scaup, Aythya marila
Lesser scaup, Aythya affinis
Harlequin duck, Histrionicus histrionicus (R)
Surf scoter, Melanitta perspicillata
White-winged scoter, Melanitta deglandi (R)
Black scoter, Melanitta americana (R)
Long-tailed duck, Clangula hyemalis (R)
Bufflehead, Bucephala albeola
Common goldeneye, Bucephala clangula
Barrow's goldeneye, Bucephala islandica
Hooded merganser, Lophodytes cucullatus
Common merganser, Mergus merganser
Red-breasted merganser, Mergus serrator
Ruddy duck, Oxyura jamaicensis

New World quail
Order: GalliformesFamily: Odontophoridae

The New World quails are small, plump terrestrial birds only distantly related to the quails of the Old World, but named for their similar appearance and habits. Four species have been recorded in New Mexico.

Northern bobwhite, Colinus virginianus
Scaled quail, Callipepla squamata
Gambel's quail, Callipepla gambelii
Montezuma quail, Cyrtonyx montezumae

Pheasants, grouse, and allies
Order: GalliformesFamily: Phasianidae

Phasianidae consists of the pheasants and their allies. These are terrestrial species, variable in size but generally plump with broad relatively short wings. Many species are gamebirds or have been domesticated as a food source for humans. Seven species have been recorded in New Mexico.

Wild turkey, Meleagris gallopavo
White-tailed ptarmigan, Lagopus leucurus
Gunnison sage-grouse, Centrocercus minimus (Ex) (R)
Dusky grouse, Dendragapus obscurus
Sharp-tailed grouse, Tympanuchus phasianellus (Ex) (R)
Lesser prairie-chicken, Tympanuchus pallidicinctus
Ring-necked pheasant, Phasianus colchicus (I)

Grebes
Order: PodicipediformesFamily: Podicipedidae

Grebes are small to medium-large freshwater diving birds. They have lobed toes and are excellent swimmers and divers. However, they have their feet placed far back on the body, making them quite ungainly on land. Six species have been recorded in New Mexico.

Pied-billed grebe, Podilymbus podiceps
Horned grebe, Podiceps auritus
Red-necked grebe, Podiceps grisegena (R)
Eared grebe, Podiceps nigricollis
Western grebe, Aechmorphorus occidentalis
Clark's grebe, Aechmorphorus clarkii

Pigeons and doves
Order: ColumbiformesFamily: Columbidae

Pigeons and doves are stout-bodied birds with short necks and short slender bills with a fleshy cere. Eight species have been recorded in New Mexico.

Rock pigeon, Columba livia (I)
Band-tailed pigeon, Patagioenas fasciata
Eurasian collared-dove, Streptopelia decaocto (I)
Inca dove, Columbina inca
Common ground dove, Columbina passerina
Ruddy ground dove, Columbina talpacoti (R)
White-winged dove, Zenaida asiatica
Mourning dove, Zenaida macroura

Cuckoos
Order: CuculiformesFamily: Cuculidae

The family Cuculidae includes cuckoos, roadrunners, and anis. These birds are of variable size with slender bodies, long tails, and strong legs. The Old World cuckoos are brood parasites. Four species have been recorded in New Mexico.

Groove-billed ani, Crotophaga sulcirostris (R)
Greater roadrunner, Geococcyx californianus
Yellow-billed cuckoo, Coccyzus americanus
Black-billed cuckoo, Coccyzus erythropthalmus (R)

Nightjars and allies
Order: CaprimulgiformesFamily: Caprimulgidae

Nightjars are medium-sized nocturnal birds that usually nest on the ground. They have long wings, short legs, and very short bills. Most have small feet, of little use for walking, and long pointed wings. Their soft plumage is cryptically colored to resemble bark or leaves. Seven species have been recorded in New Mexico.

Lesser nighthawk,  Chordeiles acutipennis
Common nighthawk, Chordeiles minor
Common poorwill, Phalaenoptilus nuttallii
Chuck-will's-widow, Antrostomus carolinensis (R)
Buff-collared nightjar, Antrostomus ridgwayi (R)
Eastern whip-poor-will, Antrostomus vociferus (R)
Mexican whip-poor-will, Antrostomus arizonae

Swifts
Order: ApodiformesFamily: Apodidae

The swifts are small birds which spend the majority of their lives flying. These birds have very short legs and never settle voluntarily on the ground, perching instead only on vertical surfaces. Many swifts have very long, swept-back wings which resemble a crescent or boomerang. Four species have been recorded in New Mexico.

Black swift, Cypseloides niger
Chimney swift, Chaetura pelagica
Vaux's swift, Chaetura vauxi (R)
White-throated swift, Aeronautes saxatalis

Hummingbirds
Order: ApodiformesFamily: Trochilidae

Hummingbirds are small birds capable of hovering in mid-air due to the rapid flapping of their wings. They are the only birds that can fly backwards. Seventeen species have been recorded in New Mexico.

Mexican violetear, Colibri thalassinus (R)
Rivoli's hummingbird, Eugenes fulgens
Blue-throated mountain-gem, Lampornis clemenciae (R)
Lucifer hummingbird, Calothorax lucifer (R) 
Ruby-throated hummingbird, Archilochus colubris (R)
Black-chinned hummingbird, Archilochus alexandri
Anna's hummingbird, Calypte anna
Costa's hummingbird, Calypte costae (R)
Calliope hummingbird, Selasphorus calliope
Rufous hummingbird, Selasphorus rufus
Allen's hummingbird, Selasphorus sasin (R)
Broad-tailed hummingbird, Selasphorus platycercus
Broad-billed hummingbird, Cynanthus latirostris
White-eared hummingbird, Basilinna leucotis (R)
Violet-crowned hummingbird, Leucolia violiceps
Berylline hummingbird, Saucerottia beryllina (R)
Cinnamon hummingbird, Amazilia rutila (R)

Rails, gallinules, and coots
Order: GruiformesFamily: Rallidae

Rallidae is a large family of small to medium-sized birds which includes the rails, crakes, coots, and gallinules. The most typical family members occupy dense vegetation in damp environments near lakes, swamps, or rivers. In general they are shy and secretive birds, making them difficult to observe. Most species have strong legs and long toes which are well adapted to soft uneven surfaces. They tend to have short, rounded wings and tend to be weak fliers. Ten species have been recorded in New Mexico.

Rufous-necked wood-rail, Aramides axillaris (R)
Clapper rail, Rallus crepitans (R)
King rail, Rallus elegans (R)
Virginia rail, Rallus limicola
Sora, Porzana carolina
Common gallinule, Gallinula galeata
American coot, Fulica americana
Purple gallinule, Porphyrio martinicus (R)
Yellow rail, Coturnicops noveboracensis (R)
Black rail, Laterallus jamaicensis (R)

Finfoots
Order: GruiformesFamily: Heliornithidae

Heliornithidae is a small family of tropical birds with webbed lobes on their feet similar to those of grebes and coots. One species has been recorded in New Mexico.

Sungrebe, Heliornis fulica (R)

Cranes
Order: GruiformesFamily: Gruidae

Cranes are large, long-legged, and long-necked birds. Unlike the similar-looking but unrelated herons, cranes fly with necks outstretched, not pulled back. Most have elaborate and noisy courting displays or "dances". Two species have been recorded in New Mexico.

Sandhill crane, Antigone canadensis
Common crane, Grus grus (R)

Stilts and avocets
Order: CharadriiformesFamily: Recurvirostridae

Recurvirostridae is a family of large wading birds which includes the avocets and stilts. The avocets have long legs and long up-curved bills. The stilts have extremely long legs and long, thin, straight bills. Two species have been recorded in New Mexico.

Black-necked stilt, Himantopus mexicanus
American avocet, Recurvirostra americana

Plovers and lapwings

Order: CharadriiformesFamily: Charadriidae

The family Charadriidae includes the plovers, dotterels, and lapwings. They are small to medium-sized birds with compact bodies, short thick necks, and long, usually pointed, wings. They are found in open country worldwide, mostly in habitats near water. Eight species have been recorded in New Mexico.

Black-bellied plover, Pluvialis squatarola
European golden-plover, Pluvialis apricaria (R)
American golden-plover, Pluvialis dominica (R)
Killdeer, Charadrius vociferus
Semipalmated plover, Charadrius semipalmatus
Piping plover, Charadrius melodus (R)
Snowy plover, Charadrius nivosus
Mountain plover, Charadrius montanus

Sandpipers and allies
Order: CharadriiformesFamily: Scolopacidae

Scolopacidae is a large diverse family of small to medium-sized shorebirds including the sandpipers, curlews, godwits, shanks, tattlers, woodcocks, snipes, dowitchers, and phalaropes. The majority of these species eat small invertebrates picked out of the mud or soil. Different lengths of legs and bills enable multiple species to feed in the same habitat, particularly on the coast, without direct competition for food. Thirty-five species have been recorded in New Mexico.

Upland sandpiper, Bartramia longicauda
Whimbrel, Numenius phaeopus
Long-billed curlew, Numenius americanus
Hudsonian godwit, Limosa haemastica (R)
Marbled godwit, Limosa fedoa
Ruddy turnstone, Arenaria interpres (R)
Black turnstone, Arenaria melanocephala (R)
Red knot, Calidris canutus (R)
Ruff, Calidris pugnax (R)
Sharp-tailed sandpiper, Calidris acuminata (R)
Stilt sandpiper, Calidris himantopus
Curlew sandpiper, Calidris ferruginea (R)
Sanderling, Calidris alba
Dunlin, Calidris alpina
Baird's sandpiper, Calidris bairdii
Little stint, Calidris minuta (R)
Least sandpiper, Calidris minutilla
White-rumped sandpiper, Calidris fuscicollis
Buff-breasted sandpiper, Calidris subruficollis (R)
Pectoral sandpiper, Calidris melanotos
Semipalmated sandpiper, Calidris pusilla
Western sandpiper, Calidris mauri
Short-billed dowitcher, Limnodromus griseus (R)
Long-billed dowitcher, Limnodromus scolopaceus
American woodcock, Scolopax minor (R)
Wilson's snipe, Gallinago delicata
Spotted sandpiper, Actitis macularius
Solitary sandpiper, Tringa solitaria
Wandering tattler, Tringa incana (R)
Lesser yellowlegs, Tringa flavipes
Willet, Tringa semipalmata
Greater yellowlegs, Tringa melanoleuca
Wilson's phalarope, Phalaropus tricolor
Red-necked phalarope, Phalaropus lobatus
Red phalarope, Phalaropus fulicarius (R)

Skuas and jaegers
Order: CharadriiformesFamily: Stercorariidae

Skuas and jaegers are in general medium to large birds, typically with gray or brown plumage, often with white markings on the wings. They have longish bills with hooked tips and webbed feet with sharp claws. They look like large dark gulls, but have a fleshy cere above the upper mandible. They are strong, acrobatic fliers. Three species have been recorded in New Mexico.

Pomarine jaeger, Stercorarius pomarinus (R)
Parasitic jaeger, Stercorarius parasiticus (R)
Long-tailed jaeger, Stercorarius longicaudus (R)

Auks, murres, and puffins
Order: CharadriiformesFamily: Alcidae

The family Alcidae includes auks, murres, and puffins. These are short winged birds that live on the open sea and normally only come ashore for breeding. Two species have been recorded in New Mexico.

Long-billed murrelet, Brachyramphus perdix (R)
Ancient murrelet, Synthliboarmphus antiquus (R)

Gulls, terns and skimmers

Order: CharadriiformesFamily: Laridae

Laridae is a family of medium to large seabirds and includes jaegers, skuas, gulls, terns, kittiwakes, and skimmers. They are typically gray or white, often with black markings on the head or wings. They have stout, longish bills and webbed feet. Twenty-nine species have been recorded in New Mexico.

Black-legged kittiwake, Rissa tridactyla (R)
Sabine's gull, Xema sabini
Bonaparte's gull, Chroicocephalus philadelphia
Little gull, Hydrocoloeus minutus (R)
Laughing gull, Leucophaeus atricilla (R)
Franklin's gull, Leucophaeus pipixcan
Black-tailed gull, Larus crassirostris (R)
Heermann's gull, Larus heermanni (R)
Short-billed gull, Larus brachyrhynchus (R)
Ring-billed gull, Larus delawarensis
Western gull, Larus occidentalis (R)
Yellow-footed gull, Larus livens (R)
California gull, Larus californicus
Herring gull, Larus argentatus
Iceland gull, Larus glaucoides (R)
Lesser black-backed gull, Larus fuscus 
Glaucous-winged gull, Larus glaucescens (R)
Glaucous gull, Larus hyperboreus (R)
Sooty tern, Onychoprion fuscatus (R)
Least tern, Sternula antillarum
Gull-billed tern, Gelochelidon nilotica (R)
Caspian tern, Hydroprogne caspia
Black tern, Chlidonias niger
Common tern, Sterna hirundo
Arctic tern, Sterna paradisaea (R)
Forster's tern, Sterna forsteri
Royal tern, Thalasseus maxima (R)
Elegant tern, Thalasseus elegans (R)
Black skimmer, Rynchops niger (R)

Loons
Order: GaviiformesFamily: Gaviidae

Loons are aquatic birds the size of a large duck, to which they are unrelated. Their plumage is largely gray or black, and they have spear-shaped bills. Loons swim well and fly adequately, but are almost hopeless on land, because their legs are placed towards the rear of the body. Four species have been recorded in New Mexico.

Red-throated loon, Gavia stellata (R)
Pacific loon, Gavia pacifica
Common loon, Gavia immer
Yellow-billed loon, Gavia adamsii (R)

Northern storm-petrels
Order: ProcellariiformesFamily: Hydrobatidae

The storm-petrels are the smallest seabirds, relatives of the petrels, feeding on planktonic crustaceans and small fish picked from the surface, typically while hovering. The flight is fluttering and sometimes bat-like. One species has been recorded in New Mexico.

Least storm-petrel, Hydrobates microsoma (R)

Storks
Order: CiconiiformesFamily: Ciconiidae

Storks are large, heavy, long-legged, long-necked wading birds with long stout bills and wide wingspans. They lack the powder down that other wading birds such as herons, spoonbills, and ibises use to clean off fish slime. Storks lack a pharynx and are mute. One species has been recorded in New Mexico.

Wood stork, Mycteria americana (R)

Frigatebirds
Order: SuliformesFamily: Fregatidae

Frigatebirds are large seabirds usually found over tropical oceans. They are large, black, or black-and-white, with long wings and deeply forked tails. The males have colored inflatable throat pouches. They do not swim or walk and cannot take off from a flat surface. Having the largest wingspan-to-body-weight ratio of any bird, they are essentially aerial, able to stay aloft for more than a week. One species has been recorded in New Mexico.

Magnificent frigatebird, Fregata magnificens (R)

Boobies and gannets
Order: SuliformesFamily: Sulidae

The sulids comprise the gannets and boobies. Both groups are medium-large coastal seabirds that plunge-dive for fish. Two species have been recorded in New Mexico.

Blue-footed booby, Sula nebouxii (R)
Brown booby, Sula leucogaster (R)

Anhingas
Order: SuliformesFamily: Anhingidae

Anhingas are cormorant-like water birds with very long necks and long, straight beaks. They are fish eaters which often swim with only their neck above the water. One species has been recorded in New Mexico.

Anhinga, Anhinga anhinga (R)

Cormorants and shags
Order: SuliformesFamily: Phalacrocoracidae

Cormorants are medium-to-large aquatic birds, usually with mainly dark plumage and areas of colored skin on the face. The bill is long, thin, and sharply hooked. Their feet are four-toed and webbed. Two species have been recorded in New Mexico.

Double-crested cormorant, Nannopterum auritum
Neotropic cormorant, Nannopterum brasilianum

Pelicans
Order: PelecaniformesFamily: Pelecanidae

Pelicans are very large water birds with a distinctive pouch under their beak. Like other birds in the order Pelecaniformes, they have four webbed toes. Two species have been recorded in New Mexico.

American white pelican, Pelecanus erythrorhynchos
Brown pelican, Pelecanus occidentalis

Herons, egrets, and bitterns

Order: PelecaniformesFamily: Ardeidae

The family Ardeidae contains the herons, egrets, and bitterns. Herons and egrets are medium to large wading birds with long necks and legs. Bitterns tend to be shorter necked and more secretive. Members of Ardeidae fly with their necks retracted, unlike other long-necked birds such as storks, ibises, and spoonbills. Twelve species have been recorded in New Mexico.

American bittern, Botaurus lentiginosus
Least bittern, Ixobrychus exilis
Great blue heron, Ardea herodias
Great egret, Ardea alba
Snowy egret, Egretta thula
Little blue heron, Egretta caerulea (R)
Tricolored heron, Egretta tricolor
Reddish egret, Egretta rufescens (R)
Cattle egret, Bubulcus ibis
Green heron, Butorides virescens
Black-crowned night-heron, Nycticorax nycticorax
Yellow-crowned night-heron, Nyctanassa violacea

Ibises and spoonbills
Order: PelecaniformesFamily: Threskiornithidae

The family Threskiornithidae includes the ibises and spoonbills. They have long, broad wings. Their bodies tend to be elongated, the neck more so, with rather long legs. The bill is also long, decurved in the case of the ibises, straight and distinctively flattened in the spoonbills. Four species have been recorded in New Mexico.

White ibis, Eudocimus albus (R)
Glossy ibis, Plegadis falcinellus (R)
White-faced ibis, Plegadis chihi
Roseate spoonbill, Platalea ajaja (R)

New World vultures
Order: CathartiformesFamily: Cathartidae

The New World vultures are not closely related to Old World vultures, but superficially resemble them because of convergent evolution. Like the Old World vultures, they are scavengers, however, unlike Old World vultures, which find carcasses by sight, New World vultures have a good sense of smell with which they locate carcasses. Two species have been recorded in New Mexico.

Black vulture, Coragyps atratus (R)
Turkey vulture, Cathartes aura

Osprey
Order: AccipitriformesFamily: Pandionidae

Pandionidae is a family of fish-eating birds of prey possessing a very large, powerful hooked beak for tearing flesh from their prey, strong legs, powerful talons, and keen eyesight. The family is monotypic.

Osprey, Pandion haliaetus

Hawks, eagles, and kites

Order: AccipitriformesFamily: Accipitridae

Accipitridae is a family of birds of prey, which includes hawks, eagles, kites, harriers, and Old World vultures. These birds have very large powerful hooked beaks for tearing flesh from their prey, strong legs, powerful talons, and keen eyesight. Twenty-one species have been recorded in New Mexico.

White-tailed kite, Elanus leucurus
Swallow-tailed kite, Elanoides forficatus (R)
Golden eagle, Aquila chrysaetos
Northern harrier, Circus hudsonius
Sharp-shinned hawk, Accipiter striatus
Cooper's hawk, Accipiter cooperii
Northern goshawk, Accipiter gentilis
Bald eagle, Haliaeetus leucocephalus
Mississippi kite, Ictinia mississippiensis
Common black hawk, Buteogallus anthracinus
Harris's hawk, Parabuteo unicinctus
White-tailed hawk, Buteo albicaudatus (R)
Gray hawk, Buteo plagiatus (R)
Red-shouldered hawk, Buteo lineatus (R)
Broad-winged hawk, Buteo platypterus
Short-tailed hawk, Buteo brachyurus (R)
Swainson's hawk, Buteo swainsoni
Zone-tailed hawk, Buteo albonotatus
Red-tailed hawk, Buteo jamaicensis
Rough-legged hawk, Buteo lagopus
Ferruginous hawk, Buteo regalis

Barn-owls
Order: StrigiformesFamily: Tytonidae

Barn-owls are medium to large owls with large heads and characteristic heart-shaped faces. They have long strong legs with powerful talons. One species has been recorded in New Mexico.

Barn owl, Tyto alba

Owls
Order: StrigiformesFamily: Strigidae

Typical owls are small to large solitary nocturnal birds of prey. They have large forward-facing eyes and ears, a hawk-like beak, and a conspicuous circle of feathers around each eye called a facial disk. Fourteen species have been recorded in New Mexico.

Flammulated owl, Psiloscops flammeolus
Whiskered screech-owl, Megascops trichopsis (R)
Western screech-owl, Megascops kennicottii
Eastern screech-owl, Megascops asio (R)
Great horned owl, Bubo virginianus
Northern pygmy-owl, Glaucidium gnoma
Elf owl, Micrathene whitneyi
Burrowing owl, Athene cunicularia
Spotted owl, Strix occidentalis
Barred owl, Strix varia (R)
Long-eared owl, Asio otus
Short-eared owl, Asio flammeus
Boreal owl, Aegolius funereus (R)
Northern saw-whet owl, Aegolius acadicus

Trogons
Order: TrogoniformesFamily: Trogonidae

Trogons are residents of tropical forests worldwide and have soft, often colorful, feathers with distinctive male and female plumage. They have compact bodies with long tails and short necks. Two species have been recorded in New Mexico.

Elegant trogon, Trogon elegans (R)
Eared quetzal, Euptilotis neoxenus (R)

Kingfishers
Order: CoraciiformesFamily: Alcedinidae

Kingfishers are medium-sized birds with large heads, long, pointed bills, short legs, and stubby tails. Two species have been recorded in New Mexico.

Belted kingfisher, Megaceryle alcyon
Green kingfisher, Chloroceryle americana (R)

Woodpeckers
Order: PiciformesFamily: Picidae

Woodpeckers are small to medium-sized birds with chisel-like beaks, short legs, stiff tails, and long tongues used for capturing insects. Some species have feet with two toes pointing forward and two backward, while several species have only three toes. Many woodpeckers have the habit of tapping noisily on tree trunks with their beaks. Sixteen species have been recorded in New Mexico.

Lewis's woodpecker, Melanerpes lewis
Red-headed woodpecker, Melanerpes erythrocephalus
Acorn woodpecker, Melanerpes formicivorus
Gila woodpecker, Melanerpes uropygialis
Golden-fronted woodpecker, Melanerpes aurifrons (R)
Red-bellied woodpecker, Melanerpes carolinus (R)
Williamson's sapsucker, Sphyrapicus thyroideus
Yellow-bellied sapsucker, Sphyrapicus varius
Red-naped sapsucker, Sphyrapicus nuchalis
Red-breasted sapsucker, Sphyrapicus ruber (R)
American three-toed woodpecker, Picoides dorsalis
Downy woodpecker, Dryobates pubescens
Ladder-backed woodpecker, Dryobates scalaris
Hairy woodpecker, Dryobates villosus
Arizona woodpecker, Dryobates arizonae
Northern flicker, Colaptes auratus

Falcons and caracaras
Order: FalconiformesFamily: Falconidae

Falconidae is a family of diurnal birds of prey, notably the falcons and caracaras. They differ from hawks, eagles, and kites in that they kill with their beaks instead of their talons. Six species have been recorded in New Mexico.

Crested caracara, Caracara plancus (R)
American kestrel, Falco sparverius
Merlin, Falco columbarius
Aplomado falcon, Falco femoralis (R)
Peregrine falcon, Falco peregrinus
Prairie falcon, Falco mexicanus

New World and African parrots
Order: PsittaciformesFamily: Psittacidae

Characteristic features of parrots include a strong curved bill, an upright stance, strong legs, and clawed zygodactyl feet. Many parrots are vividly colored, and some are multi-colored. Most of the more than 150 species in this family are found in the New World.

Thick-billed parrot, Rhynchopsitta pachyrhyncha (Ex)

Tyrant flycatchers
Order: PasseriformesFamily: Tyrannidae

Tyrant flycatchers are Passerine birds which occur throughout North and South America. They superficially resemble the Old World flycatchers, but are more robust and have stronger bills. They do not have the sophisticated vocal capabilities of the songbirds. Most, but not all, are rather plain. As the name implies, most are insectivorous. Thirty-three species have been recorded in New Mexico.

Northern beardless-tyrannulet, Camptostoma imberbe
Dusky-capped flycatcher, Myiarchus tuberculifer
Ash-throated flycatcher, Myiarchus cinerascens
Great crested flycatcher, Myiarchus crinitus
Brown-crested flycatcher, Myiarchus tyrannulus
Great kiskadee, Pitangus sulphuratus (R)
Sulphur-bellied flycatcher, Myiodynnastes luteiventris (R)
Piratic flycatcher, Legatus leucophaius (R)
Tropical kingbird, Tyrannus melancholicus (R)
Couch's kingbird, Tyrannus couchii (R)
Cassin's kingbird, Tyrannus vociferans
Thick-billed kingbird, Tyrannus crassirostris
Western kingbird, Tyrannus verticalis
Eastern kingbird, Tyrannus tyrannus
Scissor-tailed flycatcher, Tyrannus forficatus
Olive-sided flycatcher, Contopus cooperi
Greater pewee, Contopus pertinax
Western wood-pewee, Contopus sordidulus
Eastern wood-pewee, Contopus virens (R)
Yellow-bellied flycatcher, Empidonax flaviventris (R)
Acadian flycatcher, Empidonax virescens (R)
Willow flycatcher, Empidonax traillii
Least flycatcher, Empidonax minimus
Hammond's flycatcher, Empidonax hammondii
Gray flycatcher, Empidonax wrightii
Dusky flycatcher, Empidonax oberholseri
Pacific-slope flycatcher, Empidonax difficilis (R)
Cordilleran flycatcher, Empidonax occidentalis
Buff-breasted flycatcher, Empidonax fulvifrons (R)
Black phoebe, Sayornis nigricans
Eastern phoebe, Sayornis phoebe
Say's phoebe, Sayornis saya
Vermilion flycatcher, Pyrocephalus rubinus

Vireos, shrike-babblers, and erpornis
Order: PasseriformesFamily: Vireonidae

The vireos are a group of small to medium-sized passerine birds. They are typically greenish in color and resemble wood warblers apart from their heavier bills. Thirteen species have been recorded in New Mexico.

Black-capped vireo, Vireo atricapilla (R)
White-eyed vireo, Vireo griseus
Bell's vireo, Vireo bellii
Gray vireo, Vireo vicinior
Hutton's vireo, Vireo huttoni
Yellow-throated vireo, Vireo flavifrons
Cassin's vireo, Vireo cassinii
Blue-headed vireo, Vireo solitarius
Plumbeous vireo, Vireo plumbeus
Philadelphia vireo, Vireo philadelphicus (R)
Warbling vireo, Vireo gilvus
Red-eyed vireo, Vireo olivaceus
Yellow-green vireo, Vireo flavoviridis (R)

Shrikes
Order: PasseriformesFamily: Laniidae

Shrikes are passerine birds known for their habit of catching other birds and small animals and impaling the uneaten portions of their bodies on thorns. A shrike's beak is hooked, like that of a typical bird of prey. Two species have been recorded in New Mexico.

Loggerhead shrike, Lanius ludovicianus
Northern shrike, Lanius borealis

Crows, jays, and magpies
Order: PasseriformesFamily: Corvidae

The family Corvidae includes crows, ravens, jays, choughs, magpies, treepies, nutcrackers, and ground jays. Corvids are above average in size among the Passeriformes, and some of the larger species show high levels of intelligence. Eleven species have been recorded in New Mexico.

Canada jay, Perisoreus canadensis
Pinyon jay, Gymnorhinus cyanocephalus
Steller's jay, Cyanocitta stelleri
Blue jay, Cyanocitta cristata
Woodhouse's scrub-jay, Aphelocoma woodhouseii
Mexican jay, Aphelocoma wollweberi
Clark's nutcracker, Nucifraga columbiana
Black-billed magpie, Pica hudsonia
American crow, Corvus brachyrhynchos
Chihuahuan raven, Corvus cryptoleucus
Common raven, Corvus corax

Penduline-tits
Order: PasseriformesFamily: Remizidae

The penduline-tits are a family of small passerine birds, related to the true tits. One species has been recorded in New Mexico.

Verdin, Auriparus flaviceps

Tits, chickadees, and titmice
Order: PasseriformesFamily: Paridae

The Paridae are mainly small stocky woodland species with short stout bills. Some have crests. They are adaptable birds, with a mixed diet including seeds and insects. Six species have been recorded in New Mexico.

Black-capped chickadee, Poecile atricapilla
Mountain chickadee, Poecile gambeli
Mexican chickadee, Poecile sclateri
Bridled titmouse, Baeolophus wollweberi
Juniper titmouse, Baeolophus ridgwayi
Black-crested titmouse, Baeolophus atricristatus (R)

Larks
Order: PasseriformesFamily: Alaudidae

Larks are small terrestrial birds with often extravagant songs and display flights. Most larks are fairly dull in appearance. Their food is insects and seeds. One species has been recorded in New Mexico.

Horned lark, Eremophila alpestris

Swallows
Order: PasseriformesFamily: Hirundinidae

The family Hirundinidae is adapted to aerial feeding. They have a slender streamlined body, long pointed wings, and a short bill with a wide gape. The feet are adapted to perching rather than walking, and the front toes are partially joined at the base. Eight species have been recorded in New Mexico.

Bank swallow, Riparia riparia
Tree swallow, Tachycineta bicolor
Violet-green swallow, Tachycineta thalassina
Northern rough-winged swallow, Stelgidopteryx serripennis
Purple martin, Progne subis
Barn swallow, Hirundo rustica
Cliff swallow, Petrochelidon pyrrhonota
Cave swallow, Petrochelidon fulva

Long-tailed tits
Order: PasseriformesFamily: Aegithalidae

Long-tailed tits are a group of small passerine birds with medium to long tails. They make woven bag nests in trees. Most eat a mixed diet which includes insects. One species has been recorded in New Mexico.

Bushtit, Psaltriparus minimus

Kinglets

Order: PasseriformesFamily: Regulidae

The kinglets are a small family of birds which resemble the titmice. They are very small insectivorous birds. The adults have colored crowns, giving rise to their names. Two species have been recorded in New Mexico.

Ruby-crowned kinglet, Corthylio calendula
Golden-crowned kinglet, Regulus satrapa

Waxwings
Order: PasseriformesFamily: Bombycillidae

The waxwings are a group of passerine birds with soft silky plumage and unique red tips to some of the wing feathers. In the Bohemian and cedar waxwings, these tips look like sealing wax and give the group its name. These are arboreal birds of northern forests. They live on insects in summer and berries in winter. Two species have been recorded in New Mexico.

Bohemian waxwing, Bombycilla garrulus (R)
Cedar waxwing, Bombycilla cedrorum

Silky-flycatchers
Order: PasseriformesFamily: Ptiliogonatidae

The silky-flycatchers are a small family of passerine birds which occur mainly in Central America, although the range of one species extends to central California. They are related to waxwings and like that group, have soft silky plumage, usually gray or pale-yellow. They have small crests. One species has been recorded in New Mexico.

Phainopepla, Phainopepla nitens

Nuthatches
Order: PasseriformesFamily: Sittidae

Nuthatches are small woodland birds. They have the unusual ability to climb down trees head first, unlike other birds which can only go upwards. Nuthatches have big heads, short tails, and powerful bills and feet. Three species have been recorded in New Mexico.

Red-breasted nuthatch, Sitta canadensis
White-breasted nuthatch, Sitta carolinensis
Pygmy nuthatch, Sitta pygmaea

Treecreepers
Order: PasseriformesFamily: Certhiidae

Treecreepers are small woodland birds, brown above and white below. They have thin pointed down-curved bills, which they use to extricate insects from bark. They have stiff tail feathers, like woodpeckers, which they use to support themselves on vertical trees. One species has been recorded in New Mexico.

Brown creeper, Certhia americana

Gnatcatchers
Order: PasseriformesFamily: Polioptilidae

These dainty birds resemble Old World warblers in their structure and habits, moving restlessly through the foliage seeking insects. The gnatcatchers are mainly soft bluish gray in color and have the typical insectivore's long sharp bill. Many species have distinctive black head patterns (especially males) and long, regularly cocked, black-and-white tails. Three species have been recorded in New Mexico.

Blue-gray gnatcatcher, Polioptila caerulea
Black-tailed gnatcatcher, Polioptila melanura
Black-capped gnatcatcher, Polioptila nigriceps (R)

Wrens
Order: PasseriformesFamily: Troglodytidae

Wrens are small and inconspicuous birds, except for their loud songs. They have short wings and thin down-turned bills. Several species often hold their tails upright. All are insectivorous. Ten species have been recorded in New Mexico.

Rock wren, Salpinctes obsoletus
Canyon wren, Catherpes mexicanus
House wren, Troglodytes aedon
Pacific wren, Troglodytes pacificus (R)
Winter wren, Troglodytes hiemalis
Sedge wren, Cistothorus platensis (R)
Marsh wren, Cistothorus palustris
Carolina wren, Thryothorus ludovicianus
Bewick's wren, Thryomanes bewickii
Cactus wren, Campylorhynchus brunneicapillus

Mockingbirds and thrashers

Order: PasseriformesFamily: Mimidae

The mimids are a family of passerine birds which includes thrashers, mockingbirds, tremblers, and the New World catbirds. These birds are notable for their vocalization, especially their remarkable ability to mimic a wide variety of birds and other sounds heard outdoors. The species tend towards dull grays and browns in their appearance. Nine species have been recorded in New Mexico.

Blue mockingbird, Melanotis caerulescens (R)
Gray catbird, Dumetella carolinensis
Curve-billed thrasher, Toxostoma curvirostre
Brown thrasher, Toxostoma rufum
Long-billed thrasher, Toxostoma longirostre (R)
Bendire's thrasher, Toxostoma bendirei
Crissal thrasher, Toxostoma crissale
Sage thrasher, Oreoscoptes montanus
Northern mockingbird, Mimus polyglottos

Starlings
Order: PasseriformesFamily: Sturnidae

Starlings are small to medium-sized passerine birds. They are medium-sized passerines with strong feet. Their flight is strong and direct and they are very gregarious. Their preferred habitat is fairly open country, and they eat insects and fruit. Plumage is typically dark with a metallic sheen. One species has been recorded in New Mexico.

European starling, Sturnus vulgaris (I)

Dippers
Order: PasseriformesFamily: Cinclidae

Dippers are small, stout birds that feed in cold, fast moving streams. One species has been recorded in New Mexico.

American dipper, Cinclus mexicanus

Thrushes and allies

Order: PasseriformesFamily: Turdidae

The thrushes are a group of passerine birds that occur mainly but not exclusively in the Old World. They are plump, soft plumaged, small to medium-sized insectivores or sometimes omnivores, often feeding on the ground. Many have attractive songs. Fourteen species have been recorded in New Mexico.

Eastern bluebird, Sialia sialis
Western bluebird, Sialia mexicana
Mountain bluebird, Sialia currucoides
Townsend's solitaire, Myadestes townsendi
Orange-billed nightingale-thrush, Catharus aurantiirostris (R)
Veery, Catharus fuscescens (R)
Gray-cheeked thrush, Catharus minimus (R)
Swainson's thrush, Catharus ustulatus
Hermit thrush, Catharus guttatus
Wood thrush, Hylocichla mustelina (R)
Clay-colored thrush, Turdus grayi (R)
Rufous-backed robin, Turdus rufopalliatus (R)
American robin, Turdus migratorius
Varied thrush, Ixoreus naevius (R)

Old World flycatchers
Order: PasseriformesFamily: Muscicapidae

The Old World flycatcher is a large family of small passerine birds. These are mainly small arboreal insectivores, many of which, as the name implies, take their prey on the wing. One species has been recorded in New Mexico.

Northern wheatear, Oenanthe oenanthe (R)

Olive warbler
Order: PasseriformesFamily: Peucedramidae

The olive warbler is the only representative of its family. It was formerly included with the wood-warblers, Parulidae, but DNA studies warrant its current classification.

Olive warbler, Peucedramus taeniatus

Old World sparrows
Order: PasseriformesFamily: Passeridae

Old World sparrows are small passerine birds. In general, sparrows tend to be small plump brownish or grayish birds with short tails and short powerful beaks. Sparrows are seed eaters, but they also consume small insects. One species has been recorded in New Mexico.

House sparrow, Passer domesticus (I)

Wagtails and pipits
Order: PasseriformesFamily: Motacillidae

Motacillidae is a family of small passerine birds with medium to long tails. They include the wagtails, longclaws, and pipits. They are slender ground-feeding insectivores of open country. Three species have been recorded in New Mexico.

White wagtail, Motacilla alba (R)
American pipit, Anthus rubescens
Sprague's pipit, Anthus spragueii

Finches, euphonias, and allies
Order: PasseriformesFamily: Fringillidae

Finches are seed-eating passerine birds, that are small to moderately large and have a strong beak, usually conical and in some species very large. All have twelve tail feathers and nine primaries. These birds have a bouncing flight with alternating bouts of flapping and gliding on closed wings, and most sing well. Fifteen species have been recorded in New Mexico.

Evening grosbeak, Coccothraustes vespertinus
Pine grosbeak, Pinicola enucleator
Gray-crowned rosy-finch, Leucosticte tephrocotis
Black rosy-finch, Leucosticte atrata
Brown-capped rosy-finch, Leucosticte australis
House finch, Haemorhous mexicanus
Purple finch, Haemorhous purpureus (R)
Cassin's finch, Haemorhous cassinii
Common redpoll, Acanthis flammea (R)
Red crossbill, Loxia curvirostra
White-winged crossbill, Loxia leucoptera (R)
Pine siskin, Spinus pinus
Lesser goldfinch, Spinus psaltria
Lawrence's goldfinch, Spinus lawrencei (R)
American goldfinch, Spinus tristis

Longspurs and snow buntings
Order: PasseriformesFamily: Calcariidae

The Calcariidae are a group of passerine birds that were traditionally grouped with the New World sparrows, but differ in a number of respects and are usually found in open grassy areas. Five species have been recorded in New Mexico.

Lapland longspur, Calcarius lapponicus
Chestnut-collared longspur, Calcarius ornatus
Smith's longspur, Calcarius pictus (R)
Thick-billed longspur, Rhynchophanes mccownii
Snow bunting, Plectrophenax nivalis (R)

New World sparrows

Order: PasseriformesFamily: Passerellidae

Until 2017, these species were considered part of the family Emberizidae. Most of the species are known as sparrows, but these birds are not closely related to the Old World sparrows which are in the family Passeridae. Many of these have distinctive head patterns. Thirty-seven species have been recorded in New Mexico.

Rufous-winged sparrow, Peucaea carpalis (R)
Botteri's sparrow, Peucaea botterii
Cassin's sparrow, Peucaea cassinii
Grasshopper sparrow, Ammodramus savannarum
Black-throated sparrow, Amphispiza bilineata
Lark sparrow, Chondestes grammacus
Lark bunting, Calamospiza melanocorys
Chipping sparrow, Spizella passerina
Clay-colored sparrow, Spizella pallida
Black-chinned sparrow, Spiezella atrogularis
Field sparrow, Spizella pusilla
Brewer's sparrow, Spizella breweri
Worthen's sparrow, Spizella wortheni (Ex) (R)
Fox sparrow, Passerella iliaca
American tree sparrow, Spizelloides arborea
Dark-eyed junco, Junco hyemalis
Yellow-eyed junco, Junco phaeonotus
White-crowned sparrow, Zonotrichia leucophrys
Golden-crowned sparrow, Zonotrichia atricapilla
Harris's sparrow, Zonotrichia querula
White-throated sparrow, Zonotrichia albicollis
Sagebrush sparrow, Artemisiospiza nevadensis
Vesper sparrow, Pooecetes gramineus
LeConte's sparrow, Ammospiza leconteii (R)
Nelson's sparrow, Ammospiza nelsoni (R)
Baird's sparrow, Centronyx bairdii
Henslow's sparrow, Centronyx henslowii (R)
Savannah sparrow, Passerculus sandwichensis
Song sparrow, Melospiza melodia
Lincoln's sparrow, Melospiza lincolnii
Swamp sparrow, Melospiza georgiana
Canyon towhee, Melozone fusca
Abert's towhee, Melozone aberti
Rufous-crowned sparrow, Aimophila ruficeps
Green-tailed towhee, Pipilo chlorurus
Spotted towhee, Pipilo maculatus
Eastern towhee, Pipilo erythrophthalmus (R)

Yellow-breasted chat
Order: PasseriformesFamily: Icteriidae

This species was historically placed in the wood-warblers (Parulidae) but nonetheless most authorities were unsure if it belonged there. It was placed in its own family in 2017.

Yellow-breasted chat, Icteria virens

Troupials and allies
Order: PasseriformesFamily: Icteridae

The icterids are a group of small to medium-sized, often colorful passerine birds restricted to the New World and include the grackles, New World blackbirds, and New World orioles. Most species have black as a predominant plumage color, often enlivened by yellow, orange, or red. Seventeen species have been recorded in New Mexico.

Yellow-headed blackbird, Xanthocephalus xanthocephalus
Bobolink, Dolichonyx oryzivorus (R)
Chihuahuan meadowlark,  Sturnella lilianae
Western meadowlark, Sturnella neglecta
Orchard oriole, Icterus spurius
Hooded oriole, Icterus cucullatus
Streak-backed oriole, Icterus pustulatus (R)
Bullock's oriole, Icterus bullockii
Baltimore oriole, Icterus galbula (R)
Scott's oriole, Icterus parisorum
Red-winged blackbird, Agelaius phoeniceus
Bronzed cowbird, Molothrus aeneus
Brown-headed cowbird, Molothrus ater
Rusty blackbird, Euphagus carolinus (R)
Brewer's blackbird, Euphagus cyanocephalus
Common grackle, Quiscalus quiscula
Great-tailed grackle, Quiscalus mexicanus

New World warblers

Order: PasseriformesFamily: Parulidae

The wood-warblers are a group of small often colorful passerine birds restricted to the New World. Most are arboreal, but some like the ovenbird and the two waterthrushes, are more terrestrial. Most members of this family are insectivores. Fifty species have been recorded in New Mexico.

Ovenbird, Seiurus aurocapilla
Worm-eating warbler, Helmitheros vermivorum (R)
Louisiana waterthrush, Parkesia motacilla (R)
Northern waterthrush, Parkesia noveboracensis
Golden-winged warbler, Vermivora chrysoptera (R)
Blue-winged warbler, Vermivora cyanoptera (R)
Black-and-white warbler, Mniotilta varia
Prothonotary warbler, Protonotaria citrea
Swainson's warbler, Limnothlypis swainsonii (R)
Tennessee warbler, Leiothlypis peregrina (R)
Orange-crowned warbler, Leiothlypis celata
Lucy's warbler, Leiothlypis luciae
Nashville warbler, Leiothlypis ruficapilla
Virginia's warbler, Leiothlypis virginiae
MacGillivray's warbler, Geothlypis tolmiei
Mourning warbler, Geothlypis philadelphia (R)
Kentucky warbler, Geothlypis formosa (R)
Common yellowthroat, Geothlypis trichas
Hooded warbler, Setophaga citrina
American redstart, Setophaga ruticilla
Cape May warbler, Setophaga tigrina (R)
Cerulean warbler, Setophaga cerulea (R)
Northern parula, Setophaga americana
Tropical parula, Setophaga pitiayumi (R)
Magnolia warbler, Setophaga magnolia
Bay-breasted warbler, Setophaga castanea (R)
Blackburnian warbler, Setophaga fusca (R)
Yellow warbler, Setophaga petechia
Chestnut-sided warbler, Setophaga pensylvanica
Blackpoll warbler, Setophaga striata (R)
Black-throated blue warbler, Setophaga caerulescens
Palm warbler, Setophaga palmarum
Pine warbler, Setophaga pinus (R)
Yellow-rumped warbler, Setophaga coronata
Yellow-throated warbler, Setophaga dominica (R)
Prairie warbler, Setophaga discolor (R)
Grace's warbler, Setophaga graciae
Black-throated gray warbler, Setophaga nigrescens
Townsend's warbler, Setophaga townsendi
Hermit warbler, Setophaga occidentalis
Golden-cheeked warbler, Setophaga chrysoparia (R)
Black-throated green warbler, Setophaga virens
Fan-tailed warbler, Basileuterus lachrymosus (R)
Rufous-capped warbler, Basileuterus rufifrons (R)
Golden-crowned warbler, Basileuterus culicivorus (R)
Canada warbler, Cardellina canadensis (R)
Wilson's warbler, Cardellina pusilla
Red-faced warbler, Cardellina rubrifrons
Painted redstart, Myioborus pictus
Slate-throated redstart, Myioborus miniatus (R)

Cardinals and allies
Order: PasseriformesFamily: Cardinalidae

The cardinals are a family of robust, seed-eating birds with strong bills. They are typically associated with open woodland. The sexes usually have distinct plumages. Fifteen species have been recorded in New Mexico.

Hepatic tanager, Piranga flava
Summer tanager, Piranga rubra
Scarlet tanager, Piranga olivacea (R)
Western tanager, Piranga ludoviciana
Northern cardinal, Cardinalis cardinalis
Pyrrhuloxia, Cardinalis sinuatus
Yellow grosbeak, Pheucticus chrysopeplus (R)
Rose-breasted grosbeak, Pheucticus ludovicianus
Black-headed grosbeak, Pheucticus melanocephalus
Blue grosbeak, Passerina caerulea
Lazuli bunting, Passerina amoena
Indigo bunting, Passerina cyanea
Varied bunting, Passerina versicolor
Painted bunting, Passerina ciris
Dickcissel, Spiza americana

Notes

References

See also
List of birds
Lists of birds by region
List of North American birds

External links
New Mexico Ornithological Society

Biota of New Mexico
New Mexico
New Mexico-related lists
Natural history of New Mexico